The 2022 Iga Świątek tennis season officially began on 3 January 2022 as the start of the 2022 WTA Tour. Iga Świątek entered the season as world number 9. The season saw the Polish player become the twenty-eighth world number 1 player in singles. A 37-match win streak was accumulated during the season, the longest in the twenty-first century.

Season summary

Early hard court season
Świątek started her season at the Adelaide International in January, seeded fifth. After wins against Daria Saville, Leylah Fernandez, and Victoria Azarenka, Świątek lost to Ashleigh Barty in the semifinals. She was scheduled to play at the Sydney International, seeded sixth, and her first match was scheduled to be against Emma Raducanu, but she pulled out of the tournament due to a rib injury.

Świątek entered into the Australian Open, where she was seeded seventh. She defeated qualifier Harriet Dart in the first round, Rebecca Peterson in the second round and Daria Kasatkina in the third round. All wins were in straight sets. She reached her first Australian Open quarterfinal after defeating Sorana Cîrstea in the fourth round. As of January 2022, Świątek has reached the second week of a Grand Slam at six consecutive majors, beginning with her 2020 French Open title, setting a record for the longest streak of second-week progressions. In the quarterfinal she defeated Kaia Kanepi in a match at three hours and one minute before losing to Danielle Collins in the semifinal the following day.

In February, Świątek entered into the Qatar Open, where she was seeded seventh. She defeated Viktorija Golubic and Daria Kasatkina in the second and third rounds, respectively. In the quarterfinals, she defeated top seeded Aryna Sabalenka before advancing to the semifinals where she played against Maria Sakkari, winning in straight sets. In the final, she won against fourth-seeded Anett Kontaveit, losing only two games, to claim her second WTA 1000 championship title.

March Sunshine Double
At Indian Wells, Świątek reached her third WTA 1000 final, where, as the third seed, she defeated Anhelina Kalinina, Clara Tauson and Angelique Kerber in three sets, and Madison Keys and Simona Halep, in straight sets. She defeated sixth seed Maria Sakkari, in straight sets, to win her fifth title. With the back-to-back Masters wins, Świątek reached a career-high ranking of world No. 2.

The following week, Świątek was seeded second at the Miami Open. Due to the retirement of reigning world No. 1, Ashleigh Barty, on 23 March, Świątek clinched the world No. 1 singles ranking after her second-round victory over Viktorija Golubic. The new ranking was applied on 4 April, after Barty was officially removed from the rankings. Świątek is the only Polish tennis player, male or female, to have ever held the number 1 ranking in singles, and the second Polish tennis player after Łukasz Kubot to hold a number-one ranking in singles or doubles. She then advanced to the final without dropping a set, recording victories over Madison Brengle, 14th seed Coco Gauff, 28th seed Petra Kvitová, and 16th seed Jessica Pegula. She beat Naomi Osaka in the final, becoming the fourth as well as the youngest woman (11th player overall) to complete the Sunshine Double and also the 1st woman to win the first three WTA 1000 events of the year.

Clay season
In April, Świątek participated at Stuttgart Open as the top seed after withdrawing from Charleston Open for a short time rest. She began by defeating Eva Lys and Emma Raducanu. In the semifinal, Świątek lost the first set in a tiebreak against Liudmila Samsonova but came back to win the next two sets. It was a 3 hours and 3 minutes match that not only ended up being the longest of her career then, but ended her 28-set winning streak before reaching her fourth final of the season. In the final she played against the third seed Aryna Sabalenka, winning in straight sets and claiming her fourth consecutive WTA title. However, on 27 April 2022, it was announced that Świątek pulled out of the Madrid Open due to her right shoulder injury. She said she will be taking a break to treat her arm, and will also be preparing for the upcoming Italian Open in Rome and French Open in Paris. After pulling out of Madrid, Świątek spent some time for intense training at Rafa Nadal Academy in Mallorca.

At the Italian Open, as the defending champion, she reached yet another WTA 1000 final, her fourth for the season, defeating Elena-Gabriela Ruse, Victoria Azarenka, Bianca Andreescu and Aryna Sabalenka. She also became the seventh player to reach two finals in Rome before turning 21. In the final, she beat Ons Jabeur in straight sets to claim her fifth consecutive WTA Tour title. She finished with a 28-match winning streak.

As world No. 1 entering the French Open, Świątek defeated Lesia Tsurenko, Alison Riske, and Danka Kovinić, all in straight sets. In the fourth round she defeated Chinese teenager Zheng Qinwen in three sets, losing the first set despite having five set points and leads in both the set and the tiebreak. Świątek made the semifinals defeating Jessica Pegula. She went one step further to reach the final by defeating Daria Kasatkina. In the final, Świątek conquered Coco Gauff and clinched her second French Open title, losing one set en route. She became only the 10th woman to win multiple French Open singles titles in the Open era. Having just turned 21, Świątek was the fourth youngest player to triumph more than once in Paris after Monica Seles, Steffi Graf, and Chris Evert who were younger. She finished the tournament with a 35-match winning streak, matching the longest unbeaten streak since Venus Williams in 2000 and becoming the 8th woman in the Open Era with 35 or more wins in a row.

Wimbledon and home event
At Wimbledon, Świątek won her first and second round matches before losing to Alizé Cornet in straight sets in round three. This ended her 37 match win streak, the longest such streak in the 21st century.

At the Poland Open, she defeated compatriot Magdalena Fręch in the first round before winning against Gabriela Lee in the second round. In the quarterfinals she was upset in three sets by the fifth seed Caroline Garcia who went on to win the title. The defeat ended her 18-match winning streak on clay.

US Open series
Leading up to the US Open during the North American summer, Świątek early exited at Toronto and Cincinnati. She lost the third round to Beatriz Haddad Maia and Madison Keys, respectively.

Entering the US Open, Świątek defeated Jasmine Paolini, the former champion Sloane Stephens, and Lauren Davis in a row. She reached the quarterfinals for the first time at this Major and the third of the season defeating Jule Niemeier to become the first Polish woman to reach this level at this Grand Slam. Afterwards, she defeated eighth seed Jessica Pegula to reach the semifinals for the first time in Flushing Meadows, followed by a defeat of 6th seed Aryna Sabalenka and a straight-sets victory in the final over Ons Jabeur. She is the first Polish woman to win the US Open bringing her to a total of three major titles.

Closing tournaments
At Ostrava Open, she reached the final after defeating Ajla Tomljanović, Caty McNally and Ekaterina Alexandrova on the way. The win over Alexandrova was her 60th win of the season. In the final, she played the longest match of her career so far lasting 3 hours and 16 minutes against Barbora Krejčíková which she lost in three sets. The defeat also ended her ten consecutive WTA Tour finals win streak. It marked the first loss of the final in 2022 and the second one of her career.

Subsequently, Świątek played at San Diego Open, defeating Zheng Qinwen, Coco Gauff, Jessica Pegula, and the qualifier Donna Vekić in the final, which made it her eighth title of the season. Świątek became the first player since Serena Williams in 2013 to claim the most titles (8), to win the most matches (67) and to achieve the most 'bagels' in a year (22).

At the 2022 WTA Finals held in Fort Worth, Texas, she won the group stage without dropping a set defeating Daria Kasatkina, Caroline Garcia and Coco Gauff respectively. Although she lost in the semifinal to Aryna Sabalenka, she still posted a record win-loss 67–9 in 2022, the most wins in a single season since Serena Williams in 2013. She also became the first player since Serena Williams in 2013 to collect over 11,000 ranking points in a single season.

All matches

Singles matches

Tournament schedule

Singles schedule

Yearly records

Top 10 wins

Singles

Finals

Singles: 9 (8 titles, 1 runner-up)

Earnings

Notes

References

External links

 
 
 

2022 in Polish tennis
2022 tennis player seasons
Iga Świątek tennis seasons